Kiran Manisha Mohanty (born 9 April 1989) is an Indian chess player. She holds the title of Woman Grandmaster. She was the Runners up in Asian Junior Girls Championship held at New Delhi in 2006.

Achievements
 Runners up in Asian Junior Girls Chess Championship, New Delhi in 2006
 First female chess player from Odisha to achieve Woman International Master (2006), Woman's National 'B' title (2007), and Woman Grandmaster (2010).

See also 
 Tania Sachdev
 Koneru Humpy
 Harika Dronavalli
 Nadig Kruttika
 Eesha Karavade
 Padmini Rout

References

External links 

1989 births
Living people
Indian female chess players
Chess woman grandmasters
Sportswomen from Odisha
Recipients of the Ekalavya Award
Sportspeople from Bhubaneswar
21st-century Indian women
21st-century Indian people